The Falls is a 2021 Taiwanese drama film directed and written by Chung Mong-hong and starring Alyssa Chia and Gingle Wang. The film is scheduled to have its world premiere in the Horizons section at the 78th Venice International Film Festival. It was selected as the Taiwanese entry for the Best International Feature Film at the 94th Academy Awards. The film won 4 awards and was nominated for 11 at the 58th Golden Horse Awards. It is exclusively available in more than 190 countries and regions on Netflix on January 29, 2022.

Plot
During the COVID-19 pandemic, a mother and her teenage daughter's relationship becomes strained while they quarantine in their apartment. A mother has been hearing sounds of waterfalls since then.

Cast
 Alyssa Chia as Lo Pin-wen
 Gingle Wang as Wang Jing
 Lee Lee-zen as Wang Qi-wen
 Chen Yi-wen as Mr. Chen
 Liu Liang-tso as superintendent of the apartment building
 Yang Li-yin as domestic helper
 Chang Shao-huai as doctor
 Hsu Wei-ning as doctor
 Liu Kuan-ting as firefighter
 Vent Teng as a customer of grocery store
 Huang Hsin-yao as an employee of superstore
 Queen Wei as Ru-yun
 Sung Shao-ching as Mr. Chen
 Waa Wei as Ru-xuan
 Hung Xiao-ling as Qi-wen's second wife
 Max Su as a news anchor

Release 
The Falls (Taiwanese) had its world premiere at the 2021 Venice Film Festival on 6 September 2021. It was also screened at the 2021 Toronto International Film Festival on 13 September 2021. It was screened at the  26th Busan International Film Festival in October 2021.

Awards and nominations

See also
 List of submissions to the 94th Academy Awards for Best International Feature Film
 List of Taiwanese submissions for the Academy Award for Best International Feature Film

References

External links
 

2021 films
Taiwanese drama films
2020s Mandarin-language films
Films directed by Chung Mong-hong
Films set in Taiwan
Films shot in Taiwan
Films about the COVID-19 pandemic